Ninderry is an electoral district of the Legislative Assembly in the Australian state of Queensland. It was created in the 2017 redistribution.

Located in the Sunshine Coast, Ninderry consists of the suburbs of Eumundi, Doonan, Weyba Downs, Peregian Beach, Peregian Springs, Verrierdale, North Arm, Ninderry, Valdora, Yandina, Yandina Creek, Coolum Beach, Maroochy River, Parklands, Bli Bli, Rosemount, Diddillibah, Kiels Mountain, Kunda Park, Kuluin, Forest Glen, Mons and "North Buderim".

From results of the 2015 election, Ninderry was estimated to be a fairly safe seat for the Liberal National Party with a margin of 6.9%.

Members for Ninderry

Election results

See also
 Electoral districts of Queensland
 Members of the Queensland Legislative Assembly by year
 :Category:Members of the Queensland Legislative Assembly by name

References

Electoral districts of Queensland